Vince Edward Rafferty is a former center in the National Football League for the Green Bay Packers. He played college football at the University of Colorado Boulder.

Early years
Rafferty was born Vincent Edward Rafferty on August 6, 1961, in Manhattan, Kansas. He attended Longmont High School. 

He accepted a football scholarship from the University of Colorado Boulder. He began his career as an offensive guard. As a senior, he was moved to defensive tackle.

Professional career
Rafferty was signed as an undrafted free agent by the Dallas Cowboys after the 1984 NFL Draft. He was switched to the offensive line during training camp. He was waived on August 21, 1984.

In 1985, he signed with the Denver Broncos, but suffered an injury and never got on the field.

In 1986, he was signed by the Green Bay Packers. He was released on August 22, 1986.

On July 24, 1987, he was signed by the Green Bay Packers. He was released on August 31, 1987. After the NFLPA strike was declared on the third week of the season, those contests were canceled (reducing the 16 game season to 15) and the NFL decided that the games would be played with replacement players. In September, he was signed to be a part of the Packers replacement team. He started 3 games at center during the strike. He was released on November 3, 1987.

In 1988, he was signed by the Phoenix Cardinals. He was released on August 29, 1988.

Personal life
After his NFL career, Rafferty went on to become a firefighter in Colorado, working as an emergency medical technician for the Rocky Flats Fire Department.

References

1961 births
Sportspeople from Manhattan, Kansas
Green Bay Packers players
American football centers
University of Colorado Boulder alumni
Colorado Buffaloes football players
Living people